Ragnarok Online (marketed as Ragnarök, and alternatively subtitled The Final Destiny of the Gods) is a massively multiplayer online role-playing game (MMORPG) created by Gravity based on the manhwa Ragnarok by Lee Myung-jin. It was released in South Korea on 31 August 2002 for Microsoft Windows. The game has spawned an animated series, Ragnarok the Animation, and a sequel game, Ragnarok Online 2: Legend of the Second.  Player characters exist in a world with a player environment that gradually changes with the passage of time.  Major changes in the features and history of the world take place as episodes in the RO timeline.

Gameplay
The gameplay is heavily based around Norse mythology, wherein the characters are taken from the stories around Ragnarök. Player characters interact in a 3D environment but are represented by 2D character sprites for front, back, side and diagonal facings.  The major types of server-supported gameplay are Player vs Environment, Guild vs Guild, Player vs Player.  Also supported by the game server are Group vs Group, Arena Combat, Player vs Monster, Player vs All, and various other specific scenarios at designated instance locations in the game world. Non-player character-run challenges and contests are also available with prizes, awards, and/or in a specific hall of fame listing.

Players can sign up for quests and submit them for rewards as well as access storage and teleport services for a small fee. Every town will have the usual stores and shops where players can purchase and sell their items. The stores differ from city to city because each city is affiliated with a different job that players can choose from; therefore, the goods each sell are relatively for that particular job that the city is affiliated with. Quests usually provide a unique reward such as learning a new skill or receiving a rare item.

The job system initially consisted of 13 classes, which has increased to over 50 via several updates. Each class specializes in certain skills corresponding to archetypes in a role-playing game. Additionally, numerous equipment are exclusive to particular classes. The greatness of the equipment depends on the character attribute status.

Once a player reaches player level 99 and job level 50, they can 'rebirth' their character (not applicable to expansion classes and Super Novices). Rebirthing brings a character back to level 1 for both player level and job level. Reborn characters generally work the same as regular characters up until the second class. Instead of a second class, characters that are born can transcend to a new second job, different from those of a character that hasn't been reborn. These transcended job types have  more skills and a larger number of 'stat points' to allocate to characters compared to second classes. The experience curve for transcendent jobs is significantly higher. Players are given the option to advance onto their third classes which provide an additional set of skills as well as allowing with player to break through the traditional level cap of 99.

Setting
Ragnarok Online is divided into a series of maps on two major continents, each of which has its own terrain and native monsters, though many monsters are present in multiple regions. Transportation between maps requires loading the new map and monsters are unable to travel from one map to another unless directly associated with the player such as a pet, mount, or hireling. Areas from Norse mythology are included.

Development 
The official Ragnarok Online servers underwent massive game system changes in 2010, which has been titled "Renewal". Renewal revamped game mechanics, changed the behavior and interaction of stats, gears, and modifiers in the stat system, changed the way and amount of character experience, and introduced the 3rd Job Classes. There are various other changes that come with Renewal, including interface and hotkey alterations, as well as skill changes.

On May 25, 2018, the servers of Ragnarok Online and Ragnarok Online 2 were shut down in most of Europe, excluding CIS countries. On November 28, 2021, the Malaysia, Singapore, Philippines (MSP) server of Ragnarok Online was shut down.

Reception

Related media
Gravity partnered with SkyZone Entertainment to release a series of standalone mobile phone games that supplement Ragnarok Online. The sole release in the North American market, Ragnarok: Mobile Mage, features the playable mage class. Players are given the ability to transfer earned zeny (the in-game currency) to their Ragnarok Online game account.

References

External links
 
 

 
2002 video games
Active massively multiplayer online games
Free-to-play video games
GungHo Online Entertainment franchises
Massively multiplayer online role-playing games
Video games based on Norse mythology
Video games developed in South Korea
Windows games
Windows-only games